Kennelia albifascies is a moth of the family Tortricidae first described by Lord Walsingham in 1900. It is found in China, India and Sri Lanka.

References

Moths of Asia
Moths described in 1900